Abdrezyakovo (Äbdräzäk) is a rural locality (a village) in Arslanovsky Selsoviet of Kiginsky District, Bashkortostan, Russia. The population was 23 as of 2010. There is 1 street.

Geography 
Abdrezyakovo is located 42 km east of Verkhniye Kigi (the district's administrative centre) by road. Syurbayevo is the nearest rural locality.

Ethnicity 
The village is inhabited by Bashkirs.

References 

Rural localities in Kiginsky District